2022 Uttar Pradesh Legislative Assembly election  are scheduled to be held from 10 February to 7 March 2022, in seven phases, to elect all 403 members of the Uttar Pradesh Legislative Assembly. The votes will be counted and the results will be declared on 10 March 2022.

The following is a list of candidates from major parties and alliances contesting in the election. This is not an exhaustive list of all the candidates in the election.

Constituency No. 1-42

Constituency No. 43-80

Constituency No. 81-110

Constituency No. 111-136

Constituency No. 137-191

Constituency No. 192-243

Constituency No. 244-301

Constituency No. 302-342

Constituency No. 343-403

References

State Assembly elections in Uttar Pradesh
2022 Uttar Pradesh Legislative Assembly election